Ephemerella dorothea is a species of spiny crawler mayfly in the family Ephemerellidae. It is found in North America.

Subspecies
These two subspecies belong to the species Ephemerella dorothea:
 Ephemerella dorothea dorothea Needham, 1908
 Ephemerella dorothea infrequens McDunnough, 1924

References

Further reading

External links

 

Mayflies
Articles created by Qbugbot
Insects described in 1908